Double Booked is an album by jazz pianist and composer Robert Glasper, released on the Blue Note label on August 25, 2009.  The album is Glasper's third for Blue Note.

Track listing
All songs composed by Robert Glasper except as indicated.

The Robert Glasper Trio
"Intro" - 0:30
"No Worries" - 7:06
"Yes I'm Country (And That's OK)" - 8:06
"Downtime" - 5:21
"59 South" - 6:11
"Think of One" (Thelonious Monk) - 9:12

The Robert Glasper Experiment
"4eva" (R. Glasper, Dante Smith) - 2:16
"Butterfly" (Herbie Hancock, Bennie Maupin)(lyrics by Jane Hancock) - 6:00
"Festival" - 10:02
"For You" (Sameer Gupta)(lyrics by Casey Benjamin) - 2:10
"All Matter" (Bilal Sayeed Oliver) - 6:33
"Open Mind" (Derrick Hodge) - 8:34

Charts

Personnel 
Musicians
 Robert Glasper – piano, Rhodes piano
 Vicente Archer – bass (tracks 1-6)
 Chris Dave – drums
 Derrick Hodge - electric bass (tracks 7-12)
 Casey Benjamin - alto saxophone, vocoder (tracks 7-12)
 Terence Blanchard–- voice (track 1)
 Mos Def – vocals (track 7)
 Bilal – vocals (track 11, 12)
 Jahi Sundance – turntables (track 12)

Production
 Robert Glasper – producer
 Eli Wolf – A&R
 Joe Marciano – engineer (recording, mixing)(tracks 1-6)
 Keith Lewis – engineer (recording, mixing)(tracks 7-12)
 Mike Marciano – engineer (mastering)

 Shanieka D. Brooks – product manager
 Konstantin Dzhibilov – art direction, design
 Gordon H Jee – creative director
 Joey L – photography
 Marques Green – photography

References

2009 albums
Robert Glasper albums
Blue Note Records albums
Post-bop albums
Mainstream jazz albums